Saint-Robert-Bellarmin is a municipality in the Municipalité régionale de comté du Granit in Estrie, Quebec, Canada, located on the Canada–United States border. Population is 529 as of 2021.

It is also the location of the Saint-Robert-Bellarmin Wind Project, an 80 MW project located 3 km East-South-East of the town.

The area had already been settled in 1907. The local economy revolves mostly around lumber, sugar bushes and the seasonal deer hunt. Many Bellarminois work in neighbouring Saint-Gédéon-de-Beauce.

The municipality was named after Robert Bellarmine, an Italian Jesuit who participated actively in the Counter-Reformation.

Geography
The territory of Saint-Robert-Bellarmin is equidistant from Saint-Gédéon-de-Beauce, to the north, and Saint-Ludger, to the west, from which it is a dozen kilometers away, Saint-Robert-Bellarmin is bounded in its southern part by the border which separates Quebec of Maine. The rivière du Loup and ruisseau du Loup are the two most important watercourses in the area. A mountainous expanse, the territory of Saint-Robert-Bellarmin is dominated by Mount Sandy Stream, which rises to 950 m.

References

External links

Commission de toponymie du Québec
Ministère des Affaires municipales, des Régions et de l'Occupation du territoire

Municipalities in Quebec
Incorporated places in Estrie
Le Granit Regional County Municipality